Lodve Solholm (born 14 March 1949 in Vestnes) was the county governor of Møre og Romsdal (from 2009 until retirement in 2018). He used to be a politician representing the Progress Party.

He was elected to the Norwegian Parliament from Møre og Romsdal in 1989, serving until 1993; he was out of parliament from 1993 to 1997, but was re-elected in 1997, 2001, and 2005.

Solholm was President of the Lagting 2001–2005.

He held various positions in Ørskog municipality council from 1977 to 1989, and was a member of Ålesund city council from 1999 to 2007. From 1979 to 1990 he was also a member of Møre og Romsdal county council.

References

1949 births
Living people
People from Vestnes
Progress Party (Norway) politicians
Members of the Storting
21st-century Norwegian politicians
20th-century Norwegian politicians